Homer Durward Kirby (August 24, 1911 – March 15, 2000), sometimes misspelled Dirwood or Durwood Kirby, was an American television host and announcer. He is best remembered for The Garry Moore Show in the 1950s and Candid Camera, which he co-hosted with Allen Funt from 1961 through 1966.

Early life
Homer Durward Kirby was born on August 24, 1911 in Covington, Kentucky to father Homer C. Kirby and mother Alma Haglage. His family moved to Indianapolis, Indiana, when he was 15. He graduated from Arsenal Technical High School in Indianapolis, then entered Purdue University to study engineering. However, he dropped out to become a radio announcer.

Radio
In 1936, Kirby was an announcer for WLW in Cincinnati, Ohio. In 1937, an Associated Press news story reported that he "made a name for himself" with his reporting on the Ohio River flood of 1937. He also worked at radio stations in Chicago and Indianapolis.

Kirby served in the United States Navy during World War II. Following the war, Kirby hosted Club Matinee in Chicago with Garry Moore on the NBC Blue radio network before moving to television in 1949 as an announcer. He also worked on Meet Your Navy and Honeymoon in New York on network radio.

Television

Kirby was a regular on Moore's television shows from 1950 to 1968. The Associated Press's obituary for him gives his years of working with Moore's television show as 1950-1951, 1958-1964, and 1966-1967. Kirby also appeared as a host, announcer, or guest on other television programs.  He served as one of NBC Radio's Monitor "Communicators".  

In 1967, Carol Burnett introduced Kirby and his wife, Pax, sitting in the live audience during her opening remarks of season 1 episode 4 of The Carol Burnett Show. In the middle of her opening monologue, Burnett recognized him. Then as the cameras followed, she excitedly ran off stage into the audience to greet Kirby and his wife before returning to complete her monologue.

Stage
Kirby acted in summer stock theatre, including three years' appearances in productions at the Cherry County Playhouse in Michigan.

Other information

A versatile performer, he acted in sketches, sang, and danced. He moved with ease from slapstick to suave sales pitches for the sponsor's product. Critic John Crosby called him "one of the most versatile muggers and comedians on the air."

An embarrassing moment came during a Polaroid commercial, during which he forgot to pull the tab after taking a picture of Garry Moore holding his Christmas list. After nearly a minute of a Polaroid representative yelling, "Pull the tab!" from the audience, Kirby gave a mighty yank with his long arms and pulled all seven remaining pictures out of the camera. This required a fair amount of strength, not only to burst the developer pods but to rip through the stops on the film roll.

Books
Kirby wrote three books: My Life, Those Wonderful Years; Bits and Pieces of This and That; and a children's book, Dooley Wilson.

Personal life
Kirby married Mary Paxton Young on June 15, 1941, in Chicago, Illinois. Paxton was a singer and actress on radio. She died in 1994. They had two sons, Durward Randall aka Randy Kirby, an actor (born December 5, 1942) and Dennis Paxton (born June 11, 1949).

Death
Kirby died of congestive heart failure in Fort Myers, Florida, on March 15, 2000, at the age of 88. He was buried next to his wife, Mary, in Coburn Cemetery in Fairfield County, Connecticut, where they had a summer home.

Cultural references
Kirby's name was spoofed in the animated series The Rocky and Bullwinkle Show, wherein a man's hat (size 7-5/32) was called the "Kirward Derby". It supposedly had magic powers that made its wearer the smartest person in the world. Kirby considered suing, but his business manager pointed out that it would only bring more attention to the show. Jay Ward, producer of The Bullwinkle Show, even offered to pay Kirby to sue him; however, he did not pursue any further action.

A button reading "Durward Kirby for President in '64" appears in the January 1964 edition of Mad magazine.

In The Mary Tyler Moore Show episode "Phyllis Whips Inflation" (season 5, episode 114; aired 18 January 1975), the character Phyllis Lindstrom explains that the drop in the price of her Polaroid stock is because the company hired Laurence Olivier to do its television commercials. She says they should have saved money and hired Kirby (a reference to his Polaroid commercial incident).

In the movie Pulp Fiction (1994), the character  Mia Wallace (Uma Thurman) orders a "Durward Kirby" burger.

The eponymous title track on the album Scraps by the band NRBQ includes the line: "I know a Melarooney boy named Durward Kirby; I yelled in his ear and wondered if he heard me."

Quotes
"Age is just a number, and mine is unlisted."

References

External links

  
 

1911 births
2000 deaths
American television personalities
People from Covington, Kentucky
Purdue University people
Radio and television announcers